Jack Cosgrove (June 9, 1902 – March 10, 1965) was an American special effects artist. He was nominated for five Academy Awards for Best Special Effects.

Selected filmography
Cosgrove was nominated for five Academy Awards:
 Gone with the Wind (1939)
 Rebecca (1940)
 The Pride of the Yankees (1942)
 Since You Went Away (1944)
 Spellbound (1945)

References

External links

1902 births
1965 deaths
Special effects people
People from Los Angeles County, California